Roger Booth may refer to:

 Roger Booth (philatelist), British philatelist
 Roger Booth (actor) (1933–2014), English television actor